Anastasio Fontebuoni (also spelt Anastazio Fontebuoni, or Anastagio Fontebuoni) (1571–1626) was an Italian painter of the Baroque, native of Florence. Fontebuoni proved to be one of the Florentine painters are more open to the influence of Caravaggio's naturalism. Fontebuoni was educated in the school of Domenico Passignano. According to Giovanni Baglioni, he visited Rome in the pontificate of Paul V, where he painted some pictures for the churches. His work flourished in Rome from 1600 to 1620 but this promising artist died young in Florence in 1626.

Major works 
 San Giovanni dei Fiorentini: two paintings of the Birth of the Virgin  and the Death of the Virgin, which are considered his best works.
 Santa Prisca: frescoes depicting the Saints and angels with the instruments of passion
 Santa Balbina: frescoes of the triumphal arch depicting Saint Paul and Saint Peter. Frescoes in the apse representing Saint Balbina between other martyrs.
 Santa Lucia in Selci: the Annunciation
 San Giacomo degli Spagnoli: frescoes of the vault

References

External links

Orazio and Artemisia Gentileschi, a fully digitized exhibition catalog from The Metropolitan Museum of Art Libraries, which contains material on Anastasio Fontebuoni (see index)

1571 births
1626 deaths
16th-century Italian painters
Italian male painters
17th-century Italian painters
Painters from Florence
Italian Baroque painters